Akbarabad (also Romanized as Akbarābād) is a village in Deymkaran Rural District, Salehabad District, Bahar County, Hamadan Province, Iran. At the 2006 census, its population was 80, in 18 families.

References 

Populated places in Bahar County